This is the list of the 50 members of the European Parliament for Poland in the 2009 to 2014 session. One person from People's Party entered the Parliament in December 2011, bringing the number of MEPs to 51.

List

References

External links
 www.pe2009.pkw.gov.pl

2009
List
Poland